Sun Bangla is an Indian Bengali-language free-to-air general entertainment channel owned by Sun TV Network based in Chennai, Tamil Nadu. It was launched on 2 February 2019 and broadcasts Bengali entertainment programming. Sun Bangla is the first entry of Sun TV Network into the East Indian market. Its slogan is "Mone Prane Bengali", which means "Bengali In Heart and Soul."

Currently broadcasts

Formerly broadcasts

Fiction

Drama series

Dubbed series

References

External links

Sun Group
Bengali-language television channels in India
Television channels and stations established in 2019
Television stations in Kolkata
2019 establishments in West Bengal